The 2016 Dudley Hewitt Cup was the 45th Central Canadian Jr. A Ice Hockey Championship for the Canadian Junior Hockey League. The winner of the 2016 Dudley Hewitt Cup will represent the central region in the 2016 Royal Bank Cup in Lloydminster, SK.

Teams
Trenton Golden Hawks (OJHL Champions)
Regular Season: 44-6-1-3 (1st OJHL East Division)
Playoffs: Defeated Newmarket Hurricanes (4-0), Defeated Wellington Dukes (4-1), Defeated Kingston Voyageurs (4-0), Defeated Georgetown Raiders (4-1) to win the league

Kirkland Lake Gold Miners (Host)
Regular Season: 39-12-2-1 (3rd in NOJHL East Division
Playoffs: Defeated Defeated Powassan Voodoos 4-2, Defeated Cochrane Crunch 4-1, Defeated by Soo Thunderbirds 4-0.

Soo Thunderbirds (NOJHL Champions)
Regular Season: 47-6-1-0 (1st in NOJHL West Division)
Playoffs: Defeated Soo Eagles 4-0, Defeated Elliot Lake Wildcats 4-1, Defeated Kirkland Lake Gold Miners 4-0 to win the league.

Fort Frances Lakers (SIJHL Champions)
Regular Season: 46-8-0-2 (1st in SIJHL)
Playoffs: Defeated English River Miners 4-0, Defeated Dryden Ice Dogs to win league.

Tournament

Round Robin
x = Clinched championship round berth; y = Clinched first overall

Tie Breaker: Head-to-Head, then 3-way +/-.

Results

Semifinals and finals

References
https://pointstreak.com/prostats/scoreboard.html?leagueid=255&seasonid=15419
http://pointstreaksites.com/view/ojhl
https://nojhl.com/
https://sijhlhockey.com/

2015–16 in Canadian ice hockey